Moradluy may refer to:
 Moradluy-e Olya
 Moradluy-e Sofla
 Moradluy-e Vosta